Foster F. Diebold (October 24, 1932 – April 1, 2018) was an American academic. He was the President of the University of Alaska System (1977–79) and Edinboro University of Pennsylvania (1979–96). 

During his tenure, Edinboro State College was renamed Edinboro University of Pennsylvania through the creation of the State System of Higher Education in Pennsylvania via Act 188 of 1983.The Diebold Center for the Performing Arts at Edinboro University was named in his honor in 1992, and he was inducted into the Edinboro University Athletics Hall of Fame in 2006. He was an alumnus of Monmouth University, Seton Hall University, and Rutgers University (Doctor of Education, Labor Studies and Collective Bargaining).

References

1932 births
2018 deaths
Monmouth University alumni
People from Orange, New Jersey
Presidents of the University of Alaska System
Rutgers University alumni
Seton Hall University alumni